Giovanni Costa may refer to:
 Giovanni Costa (painter, born 1826) (1826–1903), Italian painter, also called Nino Costa
 Giovanni Battista Costa (painter, born 1833) (1833–1893), Italian painter, also called Giovanni Costa
 Giovanni Costa (footballer) (1901–1968), Italian footballer

See also 
 Giovanni Battista Costa (disambiguation)